is a monthly Japanese manga magazine published by Media Factory since June 15, 2011. It is marketed as a shōnen manga magazine for female readers. It was originally to be published in April 2011, but was delayed by two months as a result of the 2011 Tōhoku earthquake and tsunami.

Serialized titles
Akaya Akashiya Ayakashi no
Andromalius
Angels of Death (Satsuriku no Tenshi)
Antimagia
Aoharu Tetsudō
Aokubi Daion - Nama desu no.
Apocalypse Alice
Aquarion Evol
Boku no Tonari ni Ankoku Hakaishin ga Imasu.
Boku to Senpai no Tekken Kōsai
Brave 10 S
Butsuzō no Machi
Card Master
Cyber Dorothy
Dokusai Grimoire
Double Gauge
Fizon Core
Gene Metallica: Unbreakable Machine-Doll Re:Acta
Ginyū Gikyoku Black Bard
Gundog
Hoshi o Ō Kodomo: Agartha no Shōnen
Imasara Nostradamus
Jijō Ari Undead
Jūgo Shōnen Hyōryūki
Kagerou Daze
Kaizoku Haku
Kamusari
Kimi no Chronos
Kioh x Kioh
Kuroinu O'Clock
Kyokō no Ō
Love of Kill
Lucky Dog 1 Blast
M@te!!
Mahō Sensō
Makai Ishi Mephisto
Malicious Code
Maria Holic Spin-off
Mikagura Gakuen Kumikyoku
Mofu Danshi
My Sweet Tyrant
Niche Sensei - Konbini ni, Satori Sesai no Shinjin ga Maiorita (ongoing)
Night Walker
Nirvana
Ookami Game
Ore Alice - Danjo Gyakuten
Orenchi no Furo Jijō
Orthoros
Phantom Tales of the Night
Rack - 13-kei no Zankoku Kikai
Ranobe Ōji Seiya
Rengoku no Karutagura
Rusted Armors
Ryū wa Tasogare no Yume o Miru
Santaku Rose
Sekimen Danshi Makkasa
Servamp (ongoing)
Shinjigen Ascension
Shūen no Shiori
Shūjin to Kamihikōki - Shōnen Paradox
Soko ni Ita no Nishiyama-san
Tales of Xillia - Side;Milla
Tenka!
Toilet no Hanatarō
Try Knights
Uta Koi. Ibun - Uta Hen.
Warui Koto
Zannen, Koko wa Sekai no Uragawa desu.
Zenin Chū-2-Byō Gakuen

References

External links
Monthly Comic Gene official website 

2011 establishments in Japan
Monthly manga magazines published in Japan
Magazines established in 2011
Shōjo manga magazines
Media Factory magazines